Marc Pfitzner (born 28 August 1984) is a German former professional footballer who played as a midfielder.

Career

Early career
Born in Braunschweig, Pfitzner started out playing as an amateur in the 8th tier Kreisliga Braunschweig for TSV Timmerlah, before moving on to two other local amateur clubs, SV Broitzem and FT Braunschweig.

Eintracht Braunschweig
He joined Eintracht Braunschweig's reserve team in 2005. Having already given up on a professional career, he finally made the jump into Eintracht Braunschweig's first team in 2007, at the age of 23. He went on to become a regular first team player in Braunschweig, appearing in 197 league games over nine seasons with the club. With Braunschweig, Pfitzner worked his way up from the 3. Liga to the 2. Bundesliga in 2011, and finally to the Bundesliga in 2013. On 29 September 2013, Pfitzner made his debut in the Bundesliga in a game against VfB Stuttgart, making him the rare case of a player who made it from the Kreisliga all the way up to the Bundesliga.

Werder Bremen II
After the 2015–16 2. Bundesliga season, Pfitzner's contract in Braunschweig was not renewed. In June 2016, he signed a two-year contract with the Werder Bremen reserves.

In May, following Werder Bremen II's relegation from the 3. Liga, it was announced Pfitzner would be one of ten players to leave the club.

References

External links

Profile at Eintracht Braunschweig

1984 births
Living people
Sportspeople from Braunschweig
Association football midfielders
German footballers
Footballers from Lower Saxony
Eintracht Braunschweig players
Eintracht Braunschweig II players
SV Werder Bremen II players
Bundesliga players
2. Bundesliga players
3. Liga players
Regionalliga players